The Conklingville Dam, in Hadley, Saratoga County, New York, is an earthen dam which holds back the Great Sacandaga Lake (in the town of Day, New York).

The dam, completed in 1930, is owned by the Hudson River–Black River Regulating District. The hydroelectric plant is named for Elmer West, a builder of the Spier Falls Dam located downstream on the Hudson.

History
At the end of the Wisconsin Glacial Episode a glacial moraine blocked the outflow of the Sacandaga River, forming "Glacial Lake Sacandaga". The rising water eventually found an outlet over a small divide at Conklingville. The outlet gradually eroded, draining the lake. The Conklingville dam was proposed to block this outlet, and nearly restore the configuration of the glacial lake.

The Sacandaga River was subject to periodic severe floods. A dam had been considered since the 1860s, both for flood control and, later, for power generation. In 1913 the "most disastrous [flood] in history" caused major damage to towns on the Hudson River below the Sacandaga:  Albany, Green Island, Rensselaer, Troy, and Watervliet. In 1922 New York established the "Hudson River Regulating District" (now the "Hudson River–Black River Regulating District") "To regulate the flow of the Hudson and Sacandaga Rivers as required by the public welfare including health and safety." The financing was done through a combination of contributions from industries that would use the generated power (95.5%), and from the communities flooded in 1913. The dam was designed by Edward Haynes Sargent. The first bids were received in 1927. The project was projected to be completed in 1929, but various setbacks, including a flood that year, delayed completion until March 27, 1930. The cost of the dam was $12 million.

Residents of the valley were bitterly opposed to the dam.  In addition to lawsuits there is a story that a group of witches put a curse on the dam in an attempt to get it to fail. More prosaically, the Fonda, Johnstown and Gloversville Railroad instituted a protracted lawsuit over the flooding of its tracks and finally won a judgement to $1.6 million.

Uses
The primary purpose of the dam was flood control, and the water level on the lake is still carefully regulated to prevent flooding while maintaining adequate flow downstream on the Hudson. The secondary purpose was power generation. As of 2016 the dam generates 22 Megawatts. The third purpose was recreation. The Great Sacandaga Lake supports boating, fishing, swimming, and water sports. Many summer rentals of homes and boats are available.

References 

Dams in New York (state)
Tourist attractions in Saratoga County, New York
Buildings and structures in Saratoga County, New York
Dams completed in 1930
1930 establishments in New York (state)